Revival is The Reverend Horton Heat's eighth studio album.

Track listing

Personnel
Jim "Reverend Horton" Heath- vocals, guitar
Jimbo Wallace - upright bass
Scott Churilla - drums
Tim Alexander - piano on "Party Mad"
Ed Stasium - producer, mixer
Dave Allen - producer, engineer
Paul Williams - engineer
Nick Wagner - artwork
Tom Blackmar - artwork
Mary Gunn - graphic design
Keith Martin - photography
Bobby Dunavin - guitar tech

References

2004 albums
The Reverend Horton Heat albums
Albums produced by Ed Stasium
Yep Roc Records albums